Evelina Ghassan El Haddad (born 30 April 2005) is a Lebanese footballer who plays as a midfielder for Lebanese club EFP and the Lebanon national team.

International career
El Haddad was called up to the Lebanon under-15 squad for the 2019 WAFF U-15 Girls Championship in Jordan.

She made her senior international debut for Lebanon on 24 August 2021, as a substitute in a 0–0 draw against Tunisia in the 2021 Arab Women's Cup. El Haddad was called up to represent Lebanon at the 2022 WAFF Women's Championship, helping her side finish runners-up.

Personal life 
El Haddad studied at the Collège de la Sainte Famille Française in Jounieh, Lebanon.

Honours 
Lebanon U15
 WAFF U-15 Girls Championship: 2019

Lebanon U18
 WAFF U-18 Girls Championship: 2022

Lebanon
 WAFF Women's Championship runner-up: 2022

See also
 List of Lebanon women's international footballers

References

External links
 

2005 births
Living people
Footballers from Kharkiv
Women's association football midfielders
Lebanese women's footballers
Eleven Football Pro players
Lebanese Women's Football League players
Lebanon women's youth international footballers
Lebanon women's international footballers
21st-century Lebanese women